Isser, formerly spelled Issers is a town and commune in Boumerdès Province, Algeria. According to the 1998 census it has a population of 27,990. As of the latest census it has 32,580 residents.

Isser is located on the south bank of the Isser River and near the centre of the Isser coastal plain, which stretches from Thenia to Naciria.

History

French conquest

 First Battle of the Issers (1837)

Algerian Revolution

Salafist terrorism

 2008 Issers bombing (19 August 2008)

Transport
The road RN 12 runs through Isser, linking it with Si-Mustapha to the west and Bordj Menaïel to the east.  The smaller RN 68 links it to Djinet in the north and Chabet el Ameur in the south.

Zawiya

Zawiya Thaalibia

Notable people

 Sidi Abder Rahman El Thaelebi, Algerian Islamic scholar
 Messaoud Aït Abderrahmane, Algerian footballer
 Raïs Hamidou, Algerian privateer

References

Communes of Boumerdès Province